The cinereous warbling finch (Microspingus cinereus) is a species of bird in the family Thraupidae. It is endemic to Brazil.  The term cinereous describes its colouration.  Its natural habitat is subtropical or tropical dry lowland grassland. It is threatened by habitat loss.

References

cinereous warbling finch
Birds of Brazil
Endemic birds of Brazil
cinereous warbling finch
cinereous warbling finch
Taxonomy articles created by Polbot